During the 2007–08 German football season, Borussia Dortmund competed in the Bundesliga.

Season summary
Dortmund experienced their worst season in 20 years, finishing in 13th place, although they managed to reach the DFB-Pokal final. Manager Thomas Doll resigned at the end of the season. He was replaced by Mainz coach Jürgen Klopp.

First-team squad
Squad at end of season

Left club during season

Competitions

Bundesliga

League table

References

Notes

Borussia Dortmund
Borussia Dortmund seasons